Hespenbusch is a farm, which belongs to the municipality of Grossenkneten. Karl Poggensee and the Hermann Oberth society (succeeded by the DAFRA, German work company for affairs of rocket) operated between 1952 and 1957 a launch site for small rockets with a maximum flight level of some kilometers, close to this farm. In 1957 the launch activities were shifted toward Cuxhaven, since the available area became too small.

External links
 http://www.raketen-modellbau-technik.de/geschichte/cuxhaven/bericht.htm
 http://www.modellraketenbau.de/countdown/cdo030301.htm
 http://www.hespenbusch.de

Oldenburg (district)